The Formula E Race at Home Challenge (formally the ABB Formula E Race at Home Challenge in support of UNICEF) was a series of esports events held as a temporary replacement of the suspended 2019–20 Formula E season due to the COVID-19 pandemic. The series was run on the platform of rFactor 2. The virtual tournament was broadcast on various Formula E social channels along with selected television partners.

British racing driver Charlie Martin was announced as the first guest participant in the Race at Home Challenge, and will occupy a permanent guest role for the entirety of the series. As such, she became the first transgender driver to be affiliated with FIA Formula E and joined a host of other female drivers who had either competed in the series or who had participated in test events.

Daniel Abt had all his points taken away after the Berlin race as he was found to have used professional gamer, Lorenz Hörzing in his place. Abt additionally paid £8,900 (10,000 Euros) to charity. Hörzing was banned from the Challenge grid outright. Abt was later suspended and released by Audi.

Teams and drivers

Replacements

Footnotes

References

2020 in esports
2019–20 Formula E season
Impact of the COVID-19 pandemic on motorsport